Sandell as a surname can refer to:

 Andy Sandell (born 1983), British football player
 Annemari Sandell-Hyvärinen (born 1977), Finnish long-distance runner
 Åsa Sandell (born 1967), Swedish journalist and professional boxer
 Ellen Sandell (born 1984), Australian environmentalist
 Håkan Sandell (born 1962), Swedish poet
 Joakim Sandell (born 1975), Swedish politician
 Lina Sandell (1832-1903), Swedish hymn writer
 Nils-Åke Sandell (1927–1992), Swedish football player and manager
 Patrik Sandell (born 1982), Swedish rally driver and 2006 junior world champion
 Robert J. Sandell, World War II fighter ace; see List of Flying Tigers pilots
 Sami Sandell (born 1987), Finnish ice hockey player
 Thomas Sandell, Swedish investment banker and billionaire
 William Sandell, Academy Award nominated art director

See also
 Johan August Sandels, a Swedish nobleman
 The Sandals, a 1960s surf rock band also known as the Sandells
 Sandel (disambiguation)

Swedish-language surnames